Carolyne Mercer Winche Pedro (born 6 July 2000) is a Brazilian artistic gymnast and a member of the national team. She participated in the 2019 Pan American Games.

Career

Pedro took part at the 2016 Gymnastics Olympic Test Event helping the Brazilian team qualify for the 2016 Olympic Games and earning the gold medal in the team all-around competition. She was named as the alternate to the 2016 Olympic team. She also earned the bronze medal on floor at the São Paulo stage of the 2016 FIG Artistic Gymnastics World Cup series.

In 2017 she earned three medals at the 2007 South American Artistic Gymnastics Championships and earned a bronze medal on the balance beam at the 2017 Pan American Individual Event Artistic Gymnastics Championships. In 2018 she helped the Brazilian team earn the gold medal at the 2018 South American Games. In 2019 she was part of the bronze-medal winning team at the 2019 Pan American Games, qualifying for the uneven bars final.

Competition history

External links
 FIG profile

References

2000 births
21st-century Brazilian women
Brazilian female artistic gymnasts
Competitors at the 2018 South American Games
Competitors at the 2019 Pan American Games
Competitors at the 2022 South American Games
Gymnasts at the 2019 Pan American Games
Living people
Medalists at the 2019 Pan American Games
Pan American Games bronze medalists for Brazil
Pan American Games medalists in gymnastics
South American Games gold medalists for Brazil
South American Games medalists in gymnastics
South American Games silver medalists for Brazil
Sportspeople from Curitiba